Eric Fisher may refer to:

 Eric Fisher (cricketer) (1924–1996), New Zealand cricketer
 Eric Fisher (American football) (born 1991), American football offensive tackle